Sayij Mahalleh (also Romanized as Sāyīj Maḩalleh; also known as Sā’ch Maḩalleh, Sag Maḩalleh, and Saj Maḩalleh) is a village in Pain Khiyaban-e Litkuh Rural District, in the Central District of Amol County, Mazandaran Province, Iran. At the 2006 census, its population was 1,325, in 342 families.

References 

Populated places in Amol County